Evgeny Ukhanov (born 1982 in Horlivka, Donetsk oblast) is a Ukrainian-Australian pianist.

Evgeny began studying music when he was 7 years old and gave his first recital at age of 9.

In 1998, he received a scholarship from the Australian Institute of Music, from which he graduated in 2002 and was on the list of outstanding graduates of the institute.

In 2000 he won the third prize of the prestigious Sydney International Piano Competition. He was 18 years old, among international contenders in the range of 16-32 years.

He continued to live in Australia and eventually became an Australian citizen in 2004.

He has been working and performing extensively ever since then. 

Some of his notable Australian performances include concert series at Government House "Stars of the Future", participation at the world famous series "Proms" concerts, Sergei Rachmaninoff and Sergei Prokofiev Piano Festivals, a festival of F. Chopin.

He has appeared on radio and television - ABC Classic FM, 2MBS FM  and TV programme "Rising Stars" in 2002.

Evgeny has performed numerous times as a soloist and a chamber musician in Sydney Opera House, City of Sydney Town Hall, City Recital Hall “Angel Place”. He also performed with orchestras such as Sydney Symphony Orchestra, Sydney Sinfonia Orchestra, Sydney Youth Orchestra, SBS Orchestra and others. He was the official accompanist for the "Master Performers of Australia" competition in Sydney, guest performer at the 5th Yamaha Australia competition for young pianists.

Other notable performances include - the Governor’s Reception for Australia Day (Gershwin “Rhapsody in Blue”), German Prime Minister in Magdeburg, Germany, the Chinese Australian Forum, the Governor of Queensland, Parliament House in Brisbane , Her Excellency the Governor of NSW, Government House in Canberra, the National Gallery Canberra .

Evgeny has also been teaching since the age of 18 and has succefully prepared many students for exams, local competitions and other performances. 

International concerts include performances in England, France, Italy, Spain, Germany, Norway, Russia, Japan, USA, Romania.

References

External links
 Official site

1978 births
Australian Institute of Music alumni
Living people
Ukrainian classical pianists
Australian classical pianists
Male classical pianists
Sydney International Piano Competition prize-winners
Ukrainian emigrants to Australia
People from Horlivka
21st-century classical pianists
21st-century Australian male musicians
21st-century Australian musicians
Australian people of Russian descent